Aaron Charlton Curry DCL (Hon.), JP, FRSA (17 August 1887 – 6 January 1957) was a Liberal Party, and briefly Liberal National, politician in the United Kingdom.

Background
Curry married Jane Cranston Wilson in 1913 and they had one daughter. Hon. DCL (Dunelm), 1951.

Career
Curry was a founder and formerly senior partner in A. C. Curry & Co., chartered accountants. He was a Fellow of the Corporation of Accountants. He was a Fellow Corporation of Certified Secretaries. He was Director of H. Young (Motors) Ltd, Norbrit Products, Ltd and other Companies.

Political career

Parliamentary
Standing as a Liberal candidate at the 1923 and 1924 general elections, Curry unsuccessfully contested the Houghton-le-Spring constituency.  He was defeated again at the Wallsend by-election in 1926, and in Bishop Auckland at a by-election in 1929 and at the 1929 general election. He was elected to the House of Commons on his sixth attempt, at the 1931 general election, when he stood as a Liberal National candidate for Bishop Auckland, defeating the sitting Labour Member of Parliament (MP) Hugh Dalton.
Although he took the Liberal National whip after the 1931 election, he consistently voted with the official Liberal Party in Commons votes. His support for free trade and opposition to the government's proposed tariffs being a major reason. In December 1932, Curry left the Liberal Nationals and took the Liberal whip. He stood as a Liberal candidate at the 1935 general election, when Dalton regained the seat. Curry did not stand for Parliament again.

Municipal
He was a member of Whickham Urban District Council from 1931 to 1937. He was a member of Newcastle upon Tyne City Council; Councillor 1941-51 and Alderman 1951–57. Lord Mayor of the City and County of Newcastle upon Tyne, 1949–50 and again 1956–57. He was Chairman of Northumberland and Tyneside River Board. He was a Justice of the Peace for County Durham. He was a Justice of the Peace for the County Borough of Newcastle upon Tyne.

Electoral record

References

External links 
 

1887 births
1957 deaths
Liberal Party (UK) MPs for English constituencies
National Liberal Party (UK, 1931) politicians
UK MPs 1931–1935